Thyridiphora gilva is a species of moth in the family Crambidae. It is found in Australia, including Queensland.

The wingspan is about 30 mm. Adults have brown wings with dark arcs and speckles on each forewing.

References

Moths described in 1926
Cybalomiinae